Milorad Savić (born 27 June 1991) is a Serbian football defender who plays for Prva Petoletka in Serbian League East, on loan from Radnik Surdulica.

References

External links
 
 

1991 births
Living people
Sportspeople from Kruševac
Association football defenders
Serbian footballers
FK Napredak Kruševac players
FK Mladi Radnik players
FK Radnik Surdulica players
Serbian SuperLiga players